The Federal College of Education (Technical), Bichi is a federal government higher education institution located in Bichi, Kano State, Nigeria. It is affiliated to Abubakar Tafawa Balewa University for its degree programmes. The current Provost is Bashir Muhammad Fagge.

History 
The Federal College of Education (Technical), Bichi was established in 1986.

Courses 
The institution offers the following courses;

 Early Childhood Care Education
 History Education
 Christian Religious Studies
 Special Education
 Technical Education
 Computer Education
 Arabic
 Adult and Non-Formal Education
 Chemistry Education
 Agricultural Science
 Biology Education
 Electrical/Electronics Education
 Primary Education Studies
 Home Economics
 Building Technology Education
 Metalwork Technology Education
 Education and Integrated Science
 French
 Physical And Health Education
 Education and Mathematics
 Fine And Applied Arts
 Business Education

Affiliation 
The institution is affiliated with the Abubakar Tafawa Balewa University to offer programmes leading to Bachelor of Education, (B.Ed.) in;

 Electrical/Electronics Education
 Building Technology Education
 Metal Work Technology Education

References 

Federal colleges of education in Nigeria
1986 establishments in Nigeria
Educational institutions established in 1986
Universities and colleges in Kano State